Jaipur Junction (Code: JP) is a railway station in Jaipur, the largest city of the Indian state of Rajasthan. It serves the Capital City of Rajasthan. This station serves as the headquarters of the Jaipur Railway Division and the North Western Railway zone of the Indian Railways.

Overview 
Jaipur station was built in 1875 and is situated at the centre of Rajasthan. Serving almost 35,000 passengers daily, Jaipur Junction is the busiest station in Rajasthan. The cornerstone of the existing Jaipur railway station building was laid on 4 May 1956 by Maharaja Sawai Man Singh II of Jaipur and construction took three years to complete. The station harnesses solar energy technology to power its operations.

Being centrally located, Jaipur Junction hosts or is close to other transportation facilities such as the inter-state bus terminal Sindhi Camp, and the newly constructed Jaipur Metro. One of India's luxury trains, the Palace on Wheels, also makes a scheduled stop in Jaipur.

Infrastructure and amenities 

The Jaipur railway station has provided free Wi-Fi for the convenience of passengers since 2015. A water recycling plant with a 500 kl/day capacity and waste-to-energy plant that converts plastic waste to diesel has also been set up. In 2019, the northwestern zone of Indian Railways upgraded the Jaipur Junction railway station by installing LED lights to improve the brightness inside the station. The station has been brought up to "airport standard" by Indian Railways through modernization and new facilities. A plan has been created by the Railways Board to further improve lighting in concourse halls, station platforms, circulating areas, waiting rooms, reservation counters, inquiry counters, foot bridges (FOB), stairs, parking areas, escalators and lifts, among other places. Recently, the Indian Government also introduced retiring rooms and can be booked from Jaipur Junction Railway station.

Lines 

The main lines passing through Jaipur are:
 Delhi–Jodhpur line via Makrana, Degana, Merta road (double broad-gauge electrified line till Phulera)
 Delhi–Ahmedabad line via Ajmer (double broad-gauge electrified line)
 Sawai Madhopur–Jaipur line terminates at Jaipur (single broad-gauge electrified line)
 Jaipur–Sikar (single broad-gauge electrified line)

Nearby railway stations 
 Gandhinagar Jaipur railway station
 Getor Jagatpura railway station
 Durgapura railway station
 Dahar Ka Balaji railway station
 Bais Godam railway station (Decommissioned and used for unscheduled halts only)
 Kanakpura railway station
 Sanganer railway station

Gallery

References

External links 

Railway stations in Jaipur
North Western Railway zone
Jaipur railway division
1875 establishments in India
Railway stations opened in 1875